Lyons is a village in Lyons Township, Cook County, Illinois, United States. Per the 2020 census, the population was 10,817. The Chicago Portage National Historic Site is located in Lyons.

History

Lyons was incorporated in 1888, though activity in the area dates back much further. In 1673 French Explorer Louis Joliet and Jesuit missionary Father Pierre Marquette left Green Bay, Wisconsin, by canoe in search of a western passage to the Pacific. As they traveled into the Spanish controlled area of Louisiana, they realized that the mighty Mississippi River drained into the already well known Gulf of Mexico.  With winter approaching, they headed north as quickly as possible. To save time, the Potawatomi Indians who were with them encouraged changing their route to the Illinois River. The short cut led to the Des Plaines River and caused the French travelers to discover “Le Portage.” This half-mile wide area of land connecting the Chicago River and the Des Plaines River, over which they could carry their canoes and supplies, was to become the discovery for which they would both become famous. Later known as the Chicago Portage, this small area became the “Gateway to the West” and was used by thousands of early settlers and traders traveling both east and west.  The discovery of “Le Portage” was part of the impetus that led to Chicago becoming a center for the world trade.

Louis Joliet conceived the idea of constructing a canal to connect the two waterways. This idea was to become a reality 200 years later with the opening of the Illinois and Michigan Canal. In time, the part of the I&M Canal that connected the south branch of the Chicago River with the Des Plaines River was replaced with the Chicago Sanitary and Ship Canal, which was completed in 1900.  Today, a statue stands in Lyons at the Chicago Portage National Historic Sight just north of Interstate 55 along Harlem Avenue, commemorating this historic National Heritage Corridor which stretches southwest through La Salle, Illinois.

From the early 1960s through the late 1980s, Lyons was known for its notorious links to organized crime. Mayor William Smith, for whom a park was named, was being subjected to a federal corruption investigation when he died from cancer in 1989. During the 1970s and 1980s, the small town was littered with notorious strip clubs and bars along its Ogden Avenue corridor. It was often referred to an area of east Ogden Avenue known as "Driftland", due to the amount of drifters in the area. However, the village changed dramatically in the 1990s, and several of the strip clubs and the majority of the bars no longer exist.

Lyons is a working class area, though much of the nearby manufacturing work has dried up (e.g., Electro-Motive & Reynolds Aluminum). The city has historically been home to a large Polish American community since the turn of the 20th century, which is reflected in three of the town's street names: Pulaski after Revolutionary War hero Casimir Pulaski as well as Warsaw and Cracow. Lyons is the subject of a recently published book by Mark Athitakis, a native of Lyons, detailing the town's rich and colorful history.

Geography
Lyons is located at  (41.813258, -87.821812).

Demographics
As of the 2020 census there were 10,817 people, 3,651 households, and 2,333 families residing in the village. The racial makeup of the village was 50.31% White, 4.57% African American, 1.53% Native American, 1.72% Asian, 0.06% Pacific Islander, 22.77% from other races, and 19.03% from two or more races. Hispanic or Latino of any race were 49.81% of the population.

There were 3,651 households, out of which 58.92% had children under the age of 18 living with them, 44.29% were married couples living together, 12.08% had a female householder with no husband present, and 36.10% were non-families. 32.79% of all households were made up of individuals, and 15.04% had someone living alone who was 65 years of age or older. The average household size was 3.66 and the average family size was 2.82.

The village's age distribution consisted of 24.7% under the age of 18, 7.1% from 18 to 24, 30% from 25 to 44, 22.4% from 45 to 64, and 15.7% who were 65 years of age or older. The median age was 36.4 years. For every 100 females, there were 95.9 males. For every 100 females age 18 and over, there were 92.4 males.

The median income for a household in the village was $66,005, and the median income for a family was $76,892. Males had a median income of $40,936 versus $33,315 for females. The per capita income for the village was $28,221. About 6.9% of families and 9.3% of the population were below the poverty line, including 10.0% of those under age 18 and 10.5% of those age 65 or over.

Note: the US Census treats Hispanic/Latino as an ethnic category. This table excludes Latinos from the racial categories and assigns them to a separate category. Hispanics/Latinos can be of any race.

Government

Lyons is in Illinois's 3rd congressional district.

The United States Postal Service operates the Lyons Post Office at 7836 Ogden Avenue.

Education
Lyons is served by the Lyons Elementary School District 103, which operates 5 elementary schools, two of which are in Lyons (Costello, and Robinson Elementary Schools). The other 3 schools are Home, Edison (Both in Stickney), and Lincoln, which is in Brookfield. Middle school students attend George Washington Middle School.

High school students from Lyons attend J. Sterling Morton West High School, located in Berwyn.

Lyons operates the Lyons Public Library at 4209 Joliet Avenue.

Notable people
Performing Arts Greg Nelson is an American makeup artist. Raised in Lyons, Nelson pursued a career as a motion picture make up artist beginning in 1975 at NBC Studios, Burbank, CA; Among his many accomplishments Nelson has been the make up artist for the character of Ronald McDonald TV commercials for 35 years beginning in 1980;
Nelson has won two Emmy Awards for The Tracey Ullman Show and Star Trek:Voyager and nominated an Academy Award for his work on film Dad.

Fred Pienkos is a computer graphics imaging specialist.  Raised in Lyons, Pienkos pursued a career creating visual effects in commercials, television and film.  He has worked on television shows including Enterprise, Teen Wolf and Game of Thrones, and films including Spider-Man 3 and The Social Network.  In 2004, Pienkos won a Primetime Emmy Award for Outstanding Special Visual Effects for a Series for his work on Enterprise.

References

External links
Village of Lyons
Lyons Public Library

Villages in Illinois
Villages in Cook County, Illinois
Chicago metropolitan area
Populated places established in 1888
1888 establishments in Illinois
Majority-minority cities and towns in Cook County, Illinois